Kilju is the Finnish word for fermented water. It is made of sugar, yeast, and water. Historically, it was called sugar wine. It often has additives such as citrus fruits, apples, berry juices, or artificial flavorings for legal reasons.

Cultural aspects
Kilju is considered to be a low-quality beverage that is consumed mainly for the sake of its alcohol content. It is commonly associated with the punk subculture.

The Finnish Alcoholic Beverages Act 1 March 2018 legalized the manufacture of kilju and wine from fruits, berries and other carbohydrate sources, without the pretense of making proper wine. Distilling the produce into pontikka (moonshine) is however still illegal, and can lead to stiff penalties of up to four years in prison if considerable quantities were to be sold.

Due to its low cost, unrefined taste and simple production process, kilju is mostly drunk by low-income people. Alternatively it can be made as a carbonated soft drink when served before the fermentation process is complete. Kilju made this way is high in sugar and carbon dioxide (CO2) content, and has little to no alcohol, being similar to a sweet lemon soda. It is a family tradition to many. The simple production process also makes it accessible to underage drinkers. Cf. sima, commonly seasoned with lemon and unpurified cane sugar, leading to a small beer or a light mead.

The first commercially produced kilju was introduced in 2022.

Production

Kilju can be produced by fermenting sugar, yeast, and water, but kilju made exclusively from sugar, yeast, and water was illegal in Finland before March 2018; therefore, grain, potatoes, fruits or berries were used during fermentation to avoid legal problems and to flavor the drink. Oranges and lemons are a popular choice for this purpose.

The process is similar to that of homebrewing wine. If done slowly, it requires rigorous hygiene and filtering of the product. If brewed fast, specialized dried yeasts are available in amounts to drive the fermentation process through before bacterial infiltration can take place, in about three days. In Finnish the latter are called pikahiiva (lit. quick-yeast), and they are sold in about a hundred gramme packs dry, as opposed to the live standard pack of brewer's yeast of 50g wet.

Properly made kilju is a clear, colorless or off-white liquid with no discernible taste other than that of ethanol. It can be produced by natural settling of the yeast over time, but nowadays various fining agents are used to hasten the process as well. Kilju can be refined into pontikka (Finnish moonshine) by means of distillation. It then resembles rum, as both are distilled from fermented cane sugar products, although rum is often made from molasses, a byproduct of the sugar refining process, or fresh sugar cane juice instead of refined, crystallized table sugar. Rum thus has a discernible taste of its own, whereas pontikka distilled from (well-clarified) kilju more resembles diluted neutral spirit, vodka, or viina.

Kilju is often produced improperly by home brewers who allow contaminants to disrupt fermentation or do not adequately filter or rack the liquid, or do not use a fining agent. The latter mistakes result in yeast being suspended, causing the mixture to be cloudy rather than clear. The yeast is not harmful, but can yield an unpleasant taste and intestinal discomfort. It is also a common mistake to leave the carbon dioxide produced by fermentation into the suspension, so that the yeast provides it with nucleation sites, keeping the yeast up in the solution. Proper technique calls for airing the product after fermentation, stirring, and perhaps for fining agents such as microsilica or various semipolar proteinaceacous or carbohydrate agents.

When homebrewing grew in popularity during the economic depression that followed the Finnish banking crisis of the early 1990s, yeast strains known as "turbo yeast" ("turbohiiva", "pikahiiva") were introduced to the market. These yeast strains enable a very rapid fermentation to full cask strength, in some cases in as little as three days (compared to several weeks required by traditional wine yeast strains). Such a short production time naturally does not allow the yeast to become lees. The introduction of turbo yeast reinforced the public's view of kilju as an easy method of procuring cheap alcohol.

Kilju is a well-established part of the Finnish alcohol and counter-culture, as witnessed even in the leading engineer school's making-and-use-of video of yore. "Four thousand litres of gases are generated. They are led to the neighbours' delight." The drink tends to invite such black humour, of the deadpan kind.

Historical variants

Kilju had to be modified before 2018 in Finland, so grain, potatoes, fruits or berries were used during fermentation to avoid legal problems and to flavor the drink. Oranges and lemons are a popular choice for this purpose.

Flavored kilju
Flavored kilju from fruits for example doesn't necessarily have to be sweet as long as all sugar is consumed by the yeast.

Fermented syrup
Fermented syrup, is kilju with sugar (plain sugar, fruits, etc.) that either has not been consumed by killed yeast, or that has been added after kilju has been cleared.

Consumption
Kilju is often mixed with juice or some other beverage to mask off tastes, of which there can be several.

Compared to wines, kilju most closely resembles Beaujolais nouveau, which is drunk after only a few weeks of fermentation. However, properly made kilju will not easily turn into vinegar, lacking the nutrients necessary for further fermentation. It is possible to drink kilju years after it was made if it has been properly stored. In fact as white wines, it ages well into 2-3a, especially when made from impure cane sugar, molasses included (fariinisokeri), or if brewed partially from oat malt and hops, as an extra strong beer.

See also 
 Fruit wine
 Pruno
 Sima
 Tharra

References

External links
 Kiljun valmistus ja käyttö

Fermented drinks
Finnish alcoholic drinks
Food and drink introduced in 2022